Azariah ( ‘Ǎzaryāh, "Yah has helped") was the third High Priest after Zadok.  C.f. , where he is called "son of Zadok", although he is elsewhere identified as the son of Ahimaaz.

Although his name appears in the list of the Zadokite family (6:4-15 in other translations) there is no direct evidence in the Bible that he was a High Priest. According to the Book of Chronicles, Azariah was believed to have been a priest that served at King Solomon's Temple. Azariah (Azarias) does appear on the list of High Priests by Josephus.

Patrilineal ancestry

See also 
 High Priest of Israel
 List of High Priests of Israel

Footnotes and references

10th-century BCE High Priests of Israel
9th-century BCE High Priests of Israel
Books of Kings people